Institute of Management Sciences may refer to:

 Institute for Operations Research and the Management Sciences, an American professional organization, which in 1995 became part of INFORMS, the Institute for Operations Research and the Management Sciences
 Institute of Management Sciences (Lahore), Pakistan, formerly known as The Pak-American Institute of Management Sciences
 Institute of Management Sciences (Peshawar), Hayatabad, Peshawar, Pakistan
 NUST Business School, Rawalpindi, Pakistan